Leroy Jenkins may refer to:

Leroy Jenkins (musician) (1932–2007), composer and free jazz violinist and violist
Leroy Jenkins (televangelist) (1934–2017), American televangelist
Leeroy Jenkins, a player character and Internet meme originating in the computer game World of Warcraft